No Secret Revealed is the debut full-length album by American metal band Affiance.

Track listing

Personnel
Affiance
Patrick Galante − drums
Dominic Dickinson − lead guitar
Brett Wondrak − rhythm guitar
Cameron Keeter − bass guitar
Dennis Tvrdik − vocals

References 

Affiance (band) albums
2010 debut albums